J. B. Eckl  is a Canadian songwriter, producer, and recording artist. Eckl lives in Topanga Canyon, near Los Angeles, California.

After doing some guitar session work with Latin pop producer K. C. Porter, Eckl signed as a staff songwriter for Porter's Insignia Music, a joint venture with Paramount subsidiary Famous Music Publishing. Soon after, he was asked to go on tour playing guitar with the 1970s funk band War. He spent two years traveling and playing with other musicians, most notably Carlos Santana. He later worked with K. C. Porter again to write and produce two tracks, including Primavera, for Santana's Supernatural, and another track of Santana's Shaman.  The Shaman track, 'One of These Days' features Eckl's lead vocal.  Eckl performed this song on stage at the Hollywood Bowl at the time of Shaman's release. Eckl also worked with Santana on the song Olympic Festival which appeared on the soundtrack for the film Girlfight. He was a featured artist on "Tonight" by Samantha James from her 2010 album Subconscious.

Interviews

References

External links

Canadian rock guitarists
Canadian male guitarists
Year of birth missing (living people)
Living people
People from Topanga, California
Canadian expatriates in the United States